The MODS (Multiplexed Optical Data Storage) Disc is an optical storage medium that is currently being developed by a group of researchers from Imperial College London. The new disc could have a capacity of 1 Terabyte per single disc.

External links
 One-Terabyte Optical Disc Technology Unveiled
 1TB Multiplexed Optical Data Storage - 100 DVDs on a single disc

Rotating disc computer storage media
Upcoming products
Optical discs